Diego Daniel Cañete (born 25 June 1986) is an Argentine footballer who currently plays as a forward for Metro Gallery.

Career statistics

Club

Notes

References

1986 births
Living people
Argentine footballers
Argentine expatriate footballers
Association football forwards
Hong Kong Premier League players
Club Atlético Independiente footballers
Racing de Olavarría footballers
Club Atlético Belgrano footballers
Happy Valley AA players
Hong Kong Rangers FC players
Hong Kong First Division League players
Argentine expatriate sportspeople in Hong Kong
Expatriate footballers in Hong Kong
Sportspeople from Buenos Aires Province